Villiers-Herbisse is a commune in the Aube department in north-central France.

Population

Geography
Villiers-Herbisse is located at the intersection of the Route Départementale 10 and the Route Départementale 198. North is the village of Semoine and south the village of Herbisse.

Local resources and productions are related to agriculture, mainly grain and intensive agriculture.

History

The village is called Villiers-sur-Herbisse until the 18th Century when it becomes Villiers-Herbisse.
Louis de Clermont d'Amboise, marquis de Reynel, died there on November 3, 1615, after a memorable military charge.

Monuments

On the right side of the Herbissonne, surrounded by the cemetery, the Catholic church of the Assumption is a religious building registered as a Historic Monument since April 15, 1958.

The old Café Richomme, built in 1911 on the Rue de la Crayère on the left side, close to the church, the townhall and the old elementary school.

See also
Communes of the Aube department

References

Communes of Aube
Aube communes articles needing translation from French Wikipedia